Chuck Close is an American painter and photographer who primarily creates massive-scale portraits. Close's portraits have simple titles, using only the subject's first name. Many of his subjects are friends who, like Close, are also artists, or dealers and collectors of art; others are simply friends or family members.

Subjects
 Self-portrait, Chuck Close
Laurie Anderson, performance artist, composer, musician
Richard Artschwager, painter, illustrator and sculptor
Susan Austad
Lynda Benglis, sculptor
Cecily Brown, painter
Paul Cadmus, painter
John Chamberlain, sculptor
Francesco Clemente, painter
Bill Clinton, politician, 42nd President of the United States
Hillary Clinton, politician and diplomat
Georgia Close (artist's daughter)
Leslie Close (artist's wife)
Maggie Close (artist's daughter)
Robert Cottingham, photorealist painter
Renee Cox, artist
Gregory Crewdson, photographer
Merce Cunningham, choreographer, dancer
Willem Dafoe, actor
Carroll Dunham
Charles Durning, actor
Robert Elson (artist's wife's junior high school friend)
Inka Essenhigh, painter
Bob Feldman
Linda Rosenkrantz Finch
Eric Fischl, painter, sculptor, printmaker
Janet Fish, painter
Renée Fleming, opera singer
Kent Floeter
Ellen Gallagher, artist
Philip Glass, composer
Arne Glimcher, art dealer, film producer
Al Gore, politician
April Gornik, painter
Nancy Graves, sculptor, painter
Kathy Halbreich, curator
Lyle Ashton Harris, artist
Keith Hollingworth
Bob Holman, poet
Robert Israel
Frank James
Jasper Johns
Ray Johnson
Bill T. Jones
Alex Katz
Klaus Kertress
Fanny Leifer
Roy Lichtenstein
Agnes Martin
Kate Moss
Elizabeth Murray
Jud Nelson
Elizabeth Peyton
Judy Pfaff
Brad Pitt
 Christopher Plummer
Robert Rauschenberg
Dorothea Rockburne
Nat Rose
Stanley Rosen
John Roy
Lucas Samaras, artist, Lucas I, 1986–1987
Richard Serra
Andres Serrano
Joel Shapiro
Cindy Sherman
James Siena
Carly Simon
Paul Simon, musician, see Stranger to Stranger album cover
Lorna Simpson
Kiki Smith
James Turrell
William Wegman
Robert Wilson
Terry Winters
Lisa Yuskavage
Joe Zucker
Kara Walker, artist

References

 
 
 
 Tapestry portraits by Chuck Close
 
 
 http://www.pacemacgill.com

Chuck Close